Book of Horizons is the fourth studio album by Secret Chiefs 3, released May 25, 2004. Book of Horizons was the first Secret Chiefs 3 album to reveal the satellite bands that form the actual band under their own names. Out of the seven bands only one, NT Fan, was not heard on the album at all. The other six are The Electromagnetic Azoth, UR, Ishraqiyun, Traditionalists, Holy Vehm and FORMS. Since the release of Book of Horizons the satellite bands have seen several releases of their own.

Content 
"The Owl in Daylight" is inspired by the final, unfinished novel of the same name by renowned science fiction writer Philip K. Dick before his death. The song "Book T: Exodus" is the theme of the 1960 film The Exodus composed by Ernest Gold.

Reception

The Allmusic review by William York stated "Secret Chiefs 3's first three studio albums were not exactly stripped-down affairs, but Book of Horizons is by far an ambitious release ... this is a frequently jaw-dropping album that should silence Spruance's anti-Bungle critics and, more importantly, challenge and entertain devoted fans of his past work". Daniel Lukes of Lollipop Magazine called the work "plaintive, harsh, witty, baffling, and thrillingly alien," saying "The overall effect is akin to the imaginary soundtrack to an uncanny, Burroughs-esque parallel universe where gumshoes mix with Arabian mystics, cowboys, and aliens in search for the Ultimate Truth."
Pitchfork contributor Jonathan Zwickel noted "Over three years in the making, Book of Horizons is Secret Chiefs' most expansive and coherent statement, an alchemical fusion of Morricone-esque cinematic grandeur, midnight surf guitar, traditional Middle Eastern rhythms and time signatures, demonic death metal, and electronic deviance that yields a work of undeniable force"

The Scene Point Blank review warned "If you have a short attention span you are probably going to get lost mid-way through Book of Horizons. If you're looking for something straightforward, this will be a waste of your time. This is experimental music at its finest".

Track listing

Personnel
 Trey Spruance – guitars (electric guitar, bass guitar, microtonal guitar, sympitar), keyboards (keyboard, electric piano, acoustic piano, tack piano, clavinet, organ), percussion (dumbek, shaker, tambourine, add'l daf, etc.), santur, rabab, banjo, saz, sheng, synthesizer, sampler, soundscape, Foley sound effects, electroacoustic treatment, vocals, producer, engineer
 Mike Bennewitz – layout design, illustrations
 Thom Canova – engineer
 Unhuman - Vocals
 Jennifer Cass – harp
 Rich Doucette – esraj, sarangi
 Enemy – bass guitar, guitar, sampling
 Fatima – santur
 Jesse Greere – vocals
 Timb Harris – violin, viola
 Danny Heifetz – drums
 Shahzad Ismaily – percussion (dhol, mridangam, ghatam, zil, etc.)
 Eyvind Kang – viola
 Jai Young Kim – post producer
 Jessika Kenney – vocals
 Kevin Kmetz – shamisen
 Ursula Knudson – bowed saw
 John Merryman – drums
 Chris Parsons – engineer
 Jesse Quattro – vocals
 Jason Schimmel – acoustic guitar
 Ches Smith – drums
 Tim Smolens – bass, engineer
 William Winant – drums, percussion (tabla, marimba, shaker, glockenspiel, gong, tubular bell, timpani, etc.)

References

External links 

 

2004 albums
Secret Chiefs 3 albums
Web of Mimicry albums
Albums produced by Trey Spruance